PMQ, PMQs or pmq may refer to:

Places and buildings
 PMQ (Hong Kong) (formerly Police Married Quarters), a site in Hong Kong
 PMQ (military housing) (Permanent Married Quarters or Private Married Quarters), Canadian military housing
 Perito Moreno Airport (IATA code: PMQ), an airport in Argentina

Other uses
 Prime Minister's Questions (PMQs), a constitutional convention in the UK
 Prime Minister's Questions, television and radio coverage on BBC Parliament and other BBC channels
 Pame languages (ISO 639 code: pmq)
 "PMQ", a short story by Robert Harris on the collection Speaking with the Angel

See also
 CFB Lincoln Park PMQ, Calgary, a residential neighbourhood in Canada